(:  (Teochew)  (Swatow), :  or , :  or ) is a Teochew dialect romanisation system as a part of Guangdong Romanisation published by Guangdong Provincial Education Department in 1960. Tone of this system is based on Swatow dialect. The system uses Latin alphabet to transcript pronunciation and numbers to note tones. 

Before that, another system called , which was introduced by the missionaries in 1875, had been widely used. Since Teochew has high phonetic similarity with Hokkien, another Southern Min variety,  and  can also be used to transcribe Teochew. The name  is a transcription of "" using this system.

Contents

Alphabet
This system uses the Latin alphabet, but does not include f, j, q, v, w, x, or y. ê is the letter e with circumflex.

Initials
There are 18 initials. Syllables not starting with consonants are called zero initials.

b and g can also be used as ending consonants.

Finals
There are 59 finals :

Tones

Symbols of tones are notated at the top right of consonants or vowels which have top loudness. For example:
 詩 - si1
 死 - si2
 世 - si3
 薛 - sih4

Differences in rime
This is a list of differences in rime in Teochew dialect by regions. Tone in Raoping is almost same as in Swatow. Only general differences are listed, some certain distinctions of certain words are not listed.

References

Romanization of Chinese
Teochew dialect
Latin-script orthographies